The Queen's Necklace is an 1850 novel by Alexandre Dumas

The Queen's Necklace may also refer to:

The Queen's Necklace (1909 film) a French short film adaptation of the 1850 novel
 The Queen's Necklace (1929 film), a 1929 French historical drama film
 The Queen's Necklace (1946 film), a 1946 French historical drama film 
 The Queen's Necklace, a fantasy novel by Teresa Edgerton
 "The Queen's Necklace", one of the stories in the collection Arsène Lupin, Gentleman Burglar by Maurice Leblanc
 The Queen's Necklace: A Swedish Folktale, a children's book by Helena Nyblom
 The Queen's Necklace, a novel by Antal Szerb
 Queen's Necklace (game), a board game by Bruno Faidutti and Bruno Cathala
 a popular name for Marine Drive, Mumbai

See also 
 The Affair of the Necklace (disambiguation)